Ioannis "Giannis" Vavatsikos (alternate spelling: Yannis) (born August 17, 1990) is a Greek professional basketball player for Karditsa of the Greek 2nd division. He is a 2.01 m (6'7") tall small forward-power forward.

Professional career
Vavatsikos signed with the Greek Basket League club GSL Faros, in 2017. He then became the club's team captain.

On June 28, 2018, he joined Kastoria of the Greek 2nd division.

References

External links
FIBA Europe Profile
Basketball-reference.com Profile
Eurobasket.com Profile
Greek Basket League Profile 
BGBasket.com Profile
Draftexpress.com Profile
AEK.com Profile

1990 births
Living people
AEK B.C. players
Doxa Lefkadas B.C. players
Ethnikos Piraeus B.C. players
Greek men's basketball players
Gymnastikos S. Larissas B.C. players
Ilysiakos B.C. players
Kastorias B.C. players
Larisa B.C. players
Maroussi B.C. players
Near East B.C. players
Olympias Patras B.C. players
Small forwards
Power forwards (basketball)
Basketball players from Larissa